= Charmidea =

Town of ancient Bithynia

Coordinates: 40°27′34″N 29°17′40″E

Charmidea was a town of ancient Bithynia. Its name does not appear in ancient authors but is inferred from epigraphic evidence.

Its site is located near Çeltikçi in Asiatic Turkey.
